John Wilfred Loaring (August 3, 1915 – November 21, 1969) was a Canadian athlete who competed in the 1936 Summer Olympics.

He was born in Winnipeg, Manitoba and died in Windsor, Ontario.

In 1936 he won the silver medal in the 400 metre hurdles event. In the 400 metre competition he finished sixth. He was also a member of the Canadian relay team which finished fourth in the 4×400 metre contest.

At the 1938 Empire Games he won the gold medal in the 440 yards hurdles event. He also won the gold medal with the Canadian team in the 4×110 yards relay competition as well as in the 4×440 yards relay contest. In the 440 yards event he finished fifth.

On November 20, 1969, Loaring died of cancer at age 54.

In 2015, Loaring was posthumously inducted into the Canada's Sports Hall of Fame.

In 2017, the Windsor Open Track and Field Meet was renamed the Johnny Loaring Classic in order to recognize Mr. Loaring's contributions to the sport of athletics and the Community.

References

External links
 

1915 births
1969 deaths
Canadian male hurdlers
Canadian male sprinters
Olympic track and field athletes of Canada
Athletes (track and field) at the 1936 Summer Olympics
Olympic silver medalists for Canada
Athletes (track and field) at the 1938 British Empire Games
Commonwealth Games gold medallists for Canada
Athletes from Winnipeg
Commonwealth Games medallists in athletics
Medalists at the 1936 Summer Olympics
Olympic silver medalists in athletics (track and field)
Deaths from cancer in Ontario
Medallists at the 1938 British Empire Games